Camille Guerre (born 27 October 1996) is a French competitor in synchronized swimming who competed in the 2014 FINA World Junior Synchronised Swimming Championships.

Personal
Camille Guerre was born on 27 October 1996 in Sèvres.

In 2014, she passed the scientific baccalauréat with summa cum laude distinction.

She benefits from the high level athletes program sponsored by the Minister of Youth Affairs and Sports (France).

Since September 2014, she is a bachelor in science student in mathematics at UPMC

Synchronized swimming
Camille Guerre is a synchronized swimmer.

In 2011, she has been awarded as athletes of the year by the municipality of Aix en Provence

Career records

Solo
2013, Junior France National Championships, 3rd

2013, Open make up for ever, 8th

2014, Junior France National Championships, 2nd

2014, Open make up for ever, 7th

Duet
2013, Junior France National Championships, 1st
2013, Junior European Championships, Poznań, 4th (with Estel-Anaïs Hubaud)
2014, Open make up for ever, 12th

Team
2012, Junior World Championships, Volos, 10th (with Morgane Beteille, Maureen Dos Santos, Estel-Anaïs Hubaud, May Jouvenez, Lisa Richaud, Laurie Savary, Fanny Soulard)
2013, Junior France National Championships, 1st
2013, Junior European Championships, Poznań, 6th (with Morgane Beteille, Alice Boucher, Maureen Dos Santos, Estel-Anaïs Hubaud, Louise Pastres, Estelle Philibert, Fanny Soulard)

References

Living people
1996 births
French synchronized swimmers